Euxoa violaris, the violet dart moth, is a species of moth native to North America. It is listed as a species of special concern in the US state of Connecticut. It was described by Augustus Radcliffe Grote and Coleman Townsend Robinson in 1868.

References

violaris
Moths of North America
Moths described in 1868